Majella Wiemers is an Australian television news, current affairs and weather presenter and producer. She was previously the executive producer of Breakfast on Network Ten until she quit the show on 6 July 2012.

Career
Queensland born-and bred, Wiemers graduated with a BA, majoring in journalism, from the University of Queensland in 1996. The following year she started in regional television and joined WIN Television as a presenter and reporter in Rockhampton and Cairns. In 1999, Wiemers was promoted to WIN's bureau chief of news. In 2000, she won the Far North Queensland Media Award for best documentary for Cyclone Steve — The Unwanted Visitor, which she produced, directed and presented. She was also a finalist for best news reporter in 2000 and 2001 and for best feature in 2001.

In 2001, Wiemers moved to Sydney and joined the Nine Network as a producer on Good Medicine, Nightline and Nine's federal election coverage. In 2002, she was a producer for RPA, one of Australia's most respected reality programs, and later that year was supervising producer for the special Christmas with the Australian Women's Weekly. A stint as series producer with Changing Rooms followed before Wiemers joined Getaway in 2003, travelling throughout Australia and internationally to produce stories for the popular holiday program.

She then became a reporter for Today. Wiemers was also a weather presenter for National Nine Early News in 2005 alongside Sharyn Ghidella and Chris Smith. She also regularly filled in for Today weather presenter Steven Jacobs.

Wiemers left the Nine Network at the end of 2007 due to contractual issues. Prior to Wiemers leaving Nine she presented the weather on Nine News PM Edition, Nine News Sydney and Nightline while Jaynie Seal was on maternity leave.

References

Nine News presenters
Australian television journalists
Year of birth missing (living people)
Living people